Greg Fisher, or variants in that name, could refer to:

 Greg Fischer (born 1958), American businessman and entrepreneur, mayor of Louisville, Kentucky
 Gregg S. Fisher, American investment manager
 Greg Fisher (sailor)
 Greg Fisher (historian), British author and editor of works on the ancient world

See also
Murder of Constable Thomas King, a 1978 crime in Canada committed by high school students Darrell Crook and Gregory Fischer